Pelly Bay is an Arctic waterway in Kitikmeot Region, Nunavut, Canada. It is located in the Gulf of Boothia. To the east, it is bounded by the Simpson Peninsula. Helen Island lies in the bay. Pelly Bay is named after Sir John Pelly, governor of the Hudson's Bay Company, that managed the British colony of Rupert's Land, that Pelly Bay was located within when it was named.

The settlement of Kugaaruk is located on the bay's eastern shore. Until 1999, Kugaaruk was also known as Pelly Bay.

References

Bays of Kitikmeot Region